Maygaza (Mayğaźı) is a rural locality (a selo) and the administrative centre of Maygazinsky Selsoviet, Belokataysky District, Bashkortostan, Russia. The population was 672 as of 2010. There are 15 streets.

Geography 
Maygaza is located 16 km southwest of Novobelokatay (the district's administrative centre) by road. Verkhneutyashevo is the nearest rural locality.

References 

Rural localities in Belokataysky District